Patricia Ja Lee (born July 19, 1975) is an American actress. She is best known for her roles of Cassie Chan, the Pink Ranger on the television series Power Rangers Turbo and Power Rangers in Space, and as the voice and motion capture actress for Jill Valentine in numerous entries in the Resident Evil franchise of video games. She also portrayed Haruhi Suzumiya in the first season of ASOS Brigade, a series of live-action videos to promote the show.

Aside from her acting roles, Lee also did voicework in many English dubbed adaptations of Japanese anime.

Early life 
Lee was born in Pasadena, California, she is of Korean ancestry. She attended Alliant International University in San Diego.

Career
Lee began acting in 1987, when she was 12 years old. Ten years later, Lee got her breakout role when she landed the role of Cassie Chan, the Pink Ranger for Power Rangers Turbo, a role she would continue to play in Power Rangers in Space. In 1999, she voiced Meifa Puzi in Cowboy Bebop. In 2001, Lee was cast the lead female role in the Golden Harvest action adventure Extreme Challenge.

She portrayed Haruhi Suzumiya in the first series of live-action promotional videos launched by Bandai Entertainment on December 22, 2006, to announce the R1 license of The Melancholy of Haruhi Suzumiya. Here, she is credited as Patricia Lee, although she referred to herself as Patricia Ja Lee in the first videos. Before the animated series' English cast was announced, it was speculated that she might be the voice of Haruhi as well. In July 2007, Patricia appeared at Anime Expo during the SOS Brigade concert. She was replaced for the second series of promotional videos by Cristina Vee. Lee appeared in the Haruhi anime as the voice of Mizuki Okajima, the drummer of the all-girl student band ENOZ. Lee reprised this role in The Disappearance of Nagato Yuki-chan.

Lee appeared in a 2007 Oscar Mayer bologna advertisement as a spelling bee judge.

Lee's most notable role is Jill Valentine from the Resident Evil franchise. She provided the voice and motion capture work for the character in Resident Evil 5, released in 2009. Almost a year after the release of Resident Evil 5, Capcom produced a Gold edition, featuring two new scenarios, both of which starred the character, Jill Valentine. Lee reprised her role in both of these scenarios, titled Lost In Nightmares and Desperate Escape.

In 2009 she appeared at the Anime Expo alongside her former Power Rangers co-stars Selwyn Ward, Blake Foster, Roger Velasco, and Christopher Khayman Lee as a featured guest on the Power Rangers panel. Her last appearance as an actor was the 2019 game Teppen.

Filmography

Anime roles

Other roles

References

External links
 
 

Living people
20th-century American actresses
21st-century American actresses
Actresses from California
Alliant International University alumni
American actresses of Korean descent
American film actresses
American people of Korean descent
American television actresses
American video game actresses
American voice actresses
1975 births